Vlastibor Konečný (born 2 January 1957) is a retired cyclist from Czechoslovakia. At the 1980 Summer Olympics he won a bronze medal in the 100 km time trial and finished in 17th place in the individual road race. He missed the 1984 Summer Olympics due to their boycott by Czechoslovakia and competed in the Friendship Games instead, winning a bronze medal in the team road race. He won the race of Lidice in 1975 and the Sealink Race in 1978.

References

1957 births
Living people
Czech male cyclists
Czechoslovak male cyclists
People from Frýdek-Místek
Olympic cyclists of Czechoslovakia
Cyclists at the 1980 Summer Olympics
Olympic medalists in cycling
Olympic bronze medalists for Czechoslovakia
Medalists at the 1980 Summer Olympics
Sportspeople from the Moravian-Silesian Region